Sergei Medvedev may refer to:
Sergei Medvedev (revolutionary) (1885–1937), Russian revolutionary, metalworker and trade union organizer
Sergei Medvedev (footballer) (born 1973), Russian football player
Sergei Medvedev (geologist), Soviet geologist who helped create the Medvedev–Sponheuer–Karnik scale
Sergei Medvedev (writer), Russian scholar and Pushkin Book Prize winner
Sergey Medvedev, Soviet/Russian journalist, television presenter and press secretary of Boris Yeltsin from 1995 to 1996